The Duke Street Hospital was a health facility on Duke Street in Glasgow, Scotland.

History
Duke Street was originally a Poor Law hospital, commissioned by the Glasgow Parish Council.  The facility, which was designed by Alfred Hessell Tiltman in the French Renaissance style, was opened as the Eastern District Hospital in September 1904, on the same day as the Western District Hospital at Oakbank in Maryhill and Stobhill Hospital in Springburn. A new maternity unit was completed in the 1940s and it joined the National Health Service in 1948. Physiotherapy and premature baby units were added in the 1960s.

When maternity services transferred to Rutherglen Maternity Hospital in 1977, the hospital became a geriatric facility. After services had transferred to Parkhead Hospital, it closed in 1992. The main building, which is Category B listed, was converted to residential use in the 2000s, having lain empty for some years.

References

Hospitals in Glasgow
1904 establishments in Scotland
Hospitals established in 1904
Hospital buildings completed in 1904
1992 disestablishments in Scotland
Defunct hospitals in Scotland
Elderly care
Maternity hospitals in the United Kingdom
NHS Scotland hospitals
Category B listed buildings in Glasgow
Hospitals disestablished in 1992